Bhai's Cafe is a South African musical comedy-drama film shot in the style of a Bollywood film directed by Maynard Kraak from a screenplay by Darron Meyer and Aaron Naidoo. It premiered at the 2019 Durban International Film Festival. It had a brief theatrical release in February 2020 before moving to DStv Box Office when cinemas closed the following month.

Premise
The film is set at a local café in Wynberg, Cape Town run by Bhai that comes under threat from a property developer, whose son catches the eye of his daughter.

Cast
 Mehboob Bawa as Bhai
 Suraya Rose Santos as Rashmi
 Siv Ngesi as Patrick
 Rehane Abrahams as Mary
 Thabo Bopape as Lionel
 Farouk Valley-Omar as Chaganbhai
 Jessica Sutton as Stephanie
 Masali Baduza as Thandi
 Dillon Windvogel as Shamiel
 Elodie Venece as Veena
 Stavros Cassapis as Kabir

Production
The story was the brainchild of Razia Rawoot and Mehboob Bawa, with the setting inspired by Bawa's memories of the corner shop in Claremont his family owned when he was growing up in Cape Town. Originally intended to be a sitcom, director Maynard Kraak introduced them to screenwriters Darron Meyer and Aaron Naidoo to help them turn it into a film. It was filmed on location in Cape Town.

References

External links
 

Films set in Cape Town
South African Indian films
Works about gentrification
English-language South African films
2010s English-language films